The 2011–12 Miami Heat season was the franchise's 24th season in the National Basketball Association (NBA). They came into the season as the defending Eastern Conference champions, the second season playing with the "Big Three" of Dwyane Wade, LeBron James, and Chris Bosh, and the fourth season under head coach Erik Spoelstra. Prior to the beginning of the season, they looked to bounce back from their disappointing finish to the previous year where they lost to the Dallas Mavericks in the NBA Finals.

Following the 2011 NBA lockout, the Heat played only 66 games this season and finished with a 46–20 record, roughly the equivalent of 57–25. They won their division for the 9th time and appeared in the Eastern Conference Finals for the 5th time. For the second year in a row, Wade, James, and Bosh were all selected to the NBA All-Star Game, tying the record for the most Heat players in an All-Star game in franchise history.

In the playoff, Heat and Knicks met again from first round for the first time since 2000, Heat defeated Knicks in 5 games. They would meet Pacers in the semifinals and defeat them in 6 games. On June 9, 2012, the Heat beat the Boston Celtics to advance to the NBA Finals for the second consecutive year and 3rd time in franchise history. On June 21, the Miami Heat won the NBA Championship at home against the Oklahoma City Thunder 4–1, following their 121–106 Game 5 victory to become the 2012 NBA Champions, the second NBA championship for the franchise. LeBron James won his first NBA championship, and was awarded the 2012 NBA Finals MVP.

Key dates
 June 23: The 2011 NBA draft took place at Prudential Center in Newark, New Jersey.
 December 9: The free agency period started.
 December 18: The Heat pre-season started with a game against the Orlando Magic.
 December 25: The Heat avenged their 2011 NBA Finals loss with a 105–94 win over the Dallas Mavericks to open the season.
 December 27: The Heat won their home opener against the Boston Celtics 115–107.
 February 7:  With a 19–6 season start, the Heat marked their best start in franchise history.
 February 14: The Heat became the first team to win three road games (Hawks, Bucks, & Pacers) on three consecutive nights by double digits since the 1970–71 Milwaukee Bucks.
 February 23: The Heat went into the All Star Break with their best win percentage (.794) in team history.
 February 25–26: The 2012 NBA All-Star Weekend took place.
 April 3: The Heat clinched a playoff spot with a 99–93 win over the Philadelphia 76ers.
 April 15: The Heat clinched a back to back (9th) Southeast Division title with a 93–85 win over the New York Knicks.
 April 22: The Heat defeated the Houston Rockets 97–88 in their final regular season home game.
 April 24: The Heat clinched the 2nd seed for the Eastern Conference after losing to the Boston Celtics 78–66.
 April 26: The Heat ended the regular season with a 104–70 loss against the Washington Wizards.
 May 9: The Heat defeated the New York Knicks in Game 5 of the Eastern Conference First Round, advancing to the Conference Semi-finals.
 May 24: The Heat defeated the Indiana Pacers in Game 6 of the Eastern Conference Semi-finals, advancing to the Conference Finals.
 June 9: The Heat defeated the Boston Celtics in Game 7 of the Eastern Conference Finals, advancing to the 2012 NBA Finals.
 June 21: The Heat defeated the Oklahoma City Thunder in Game 5 of the NBA Finals, winning the franchise's second championship. LeBron James was named NBA Finals MVP.

Season summary

When the Heat made it all the way to the finals in Dwyane Wade, LeBron James, and Chris Bosh's first year playing together, they were seen as heavy favorites from the Eastern Conference to return in 2012. The team's original starting lineup was:
C – Joel Anthony
PF – Chris Bosh
SF – LeBron James
SG – Dwyane Wade
PG – Mario Chalmers

The starting lineup would go through many changes as the season went on. The finals lineup in the NBA Finals is listed above.

Draft picks

Roster

Pre-season

|- bgcolor="#ccffcc"
| 1
| December 18
| Orlando
| 
| LeBron James (19)
| Udonis Haslem (9)
| Norris Cole (8)
| American Airlines Arena20,100
| 1–0
|- bgcolor="ffcccc"
| 2
| December 21
| @ Orlando
| 
| LeBron James (27)
| Chris Bosh (7)
| Chris Bosh (4)
| Amway Center19,045
| 1–1

Regular season

Standings

Record vs. opponents

Game log

|- bgcolor="#ccffcc"
| 1
| December 25
| @ Dallas
| 
| LeBron James (37)
| Udonis Haslem (14)
| LeBron JamesDwyane Wade (6)
| American Airlines Center20,421
| 1–0
|- bgcolor="#ccffcc"
| 2
| December 27
| Boston
| 
| LeBron James (26)
| Udonis Haslem (12)
| Dwyane Wade (8)
| American Airlines Arena20,166
| 2–0
|- bgcolor="#ccffcc"
| 3
| December 28
| @ Charlotte
| 
| LeBron James (35)
| Bosh, James & Haslem (6)
| LeBron James (7)
| Time Warner Cable Arena19,614
| 3–0
|- bgcolor="#ccffcc"
| 4
| December 30
| @ Minnesota
| 
| LeBron James (34)
| Chris BoshUdonis Haslem (9)
| LeBron James (10)
| Target Center19,356
| 4–0

|- bgcolor="#ccffcc"
| 5
| January 1
| Charlotte
| 
| Chris Bosh (24)
| Chris Bosh (10)
| Norris Cole (9)
| American Airlines Arena20,016
| 5–0
|- bgcolor="#ffcccc"
| 6
| January 2
| Atlanta
| 
| LeBron James (28)
| Udonis Haslem (10)
| Dwyane Wade (10)
| American Airlines Arena20,078
| 5–1
|- bgcolor="#ccffcc"
| 7
| January 4
| Indiana
| 
| LeBron James (33)
| Udonis Haslem (10)
| LeBron James (13)
| American Airlines Arena20,201
| 6–1
|- bgcolor="#ccffcc"
| 8
| January 5
| @ Atlanta
| 
| Chris Bosh (33)
| Chris BoshTerrel Harris (14)
| Mario Chalmers (8)
| Philips Arena18,371
| 7–1
|- bgcolor="#ccffcc"
| 9
| January 7
| @ New Jersey
| 
| LeBron James (32)
| Udonis Haslem (12)
| LeBron James (9)
| Prudential Center18,711
| 8–1
|- bgcolor="#ffcccc"
| 10
| January 10
| @ Golden State
|
| Dwyane Wade (34)
| LeBron James (11)
| LeBron James (7)
| Oracle Arena19,596
| 8–2
|- bgcolor="#ffcccc"
| 11
| January 11
| @ L. A. Clippers
|
| LeBron James (23)
| LeBron James (13)
| LeBron James (7)
| Staples Center19,341
| 8–3
|- bgcolor="#ffcccc"
| 12
| January 13
| @ Denver
| 
| LeBron James (35)
| Udonis Haslem (11)
| LeBron James (6)
| Pepsi Center19,155
| 8–4
|- bgcolor="#ccffcc"
| 13
| January 17
| San Antonio
| 
| LeBron James (33)
| Chris Bosh (8)
| LeBron James (10)
| American Airlines Arena19,600
| 9–4
|- bgcolor=#ccffcc
| 14
| January 19
| L. A. Lakers
| 
| LeBron James (31)
| Bosh,James & Haslem (8)
| LeBron James (8)
| American Airlines Arena20,004
| 10–4
|- bgcolor="#ccffcc"
| 15
| January 21
| Philadelphia
| 
| Chris Bosh (30)
| Udonis Haslem (10)
| Mario Chalmers (8)
| American Airlines Arena19,725
| 11–4
|- bgcolor=#ffcccc
| 16
| January 22
| Milwaukee
| 
| LeBron James (28)
| LeBron James (13)
| LeBron James (5)
| American Airlines Arena19,600
| 11–5
|- bgcolor="#ccffcc"
| 17
| January 24
| Cleveland
| 
| Chris Bosh (35)
| Udonis Haslem (10)
| LeBron James (5)
| American Airlines Arena 19,600
| 12–5
|- bgcolor="#ccffcc"
| 18
| January 25
| @ Detroit
| 
| LeBron James (32)
| LeBron James (6)
| LeBron James (7)
| The Palace of Auburn Hills18,058
| 13–5
|- bgcolor="#ccffcc"
| 19
| January 27
| New York
| 
| LeBron James (31)
| Chris Bosh (9)
| LeBron James (7)
| American Airlines Arena19,707
| 14–5
|- bgcolor="#ccffcc"
| 20
| January 29
| Chicago
| 
| LeBron James (35)
| Chris Bosh (12)
| Dwyane Wade  (7)
| American Airlines Arena20,054
| 15–5
|- bgcolor="#ccffcc"
| 21
| January 30
| New Orleans
| 
| LeBron JamesDwyane Wade (22)
| LeBron James (11)
| LeBron James (8)
| American Airlines Arena19,600
| 16–5

|- bgcolor="#ffcccc"
| 22
| February 1
| @ Milwaukee
| 
| LeBron James (40)
| Chris Bosh (9)
| Dwyane Wade (6)
| Bradley Center 10,265
| 16–6
|- bgcolor=#ccffcc
| 23
| February 3
| @ Philadelphia
| 
| Dwyane Wade (26)
| LeBron James (8)
| LeBron James (12)
| Wells Fargo Center20,694
| 17–6
|- bgcolor=#ccffcc
| 24
| February 5
| Toronto
| 
| LeBron James (30)
| LeBron James (9)
| LeBron James (4)
| American Airlines Arena19,802
| 18–6
|- bgcolor=#ccffcc
| 25
| February 7
| Cleveland
| 
| Dwyane Wade (26)
| LeBron James (6)
| Chris Bosh (9)
| American Airlines Arena20,078
| 19–6
|- bgcolor=#ffcccc
| 26
| February 8
| @ Orlando
| 
| Dwyane Wade (33)
| LeBron James(10)
| Chris Bosh (9)
| Amway Center18,972
| 19–7
|- bgcolor=#ccffcc
| 27
| February 10
| @ Washington
| 
| Dwyane Wade (26)
| LeBron James (9)
| Udonis Haslem (12)
| Verizon Center20,282
| 20–7
|- bgcolor=#ccffcc
| 28
| February 12
| @ Atlanta
| 
| LeBron James (23)
| LeBron James (6)
| Chris Bosh (26)
| Philips Arena18,371
| 21–7
|- bgcolor=#ccffcc
| 29
| February 13
| @ Milwaukee
| 
| LeBron James (35)
| Mike Miller (8)
| Chris Bosh (4)
| Bradley Center16,749
| 22–7
|- bgcolor=#ccffcc
| 30
| February 14
| @ Indiana
| 
| LeBron James (23)
| LeBron James (9)
| LeBron James (7)
| Bankers Life Fieldhouse18,165
| 23–7
|- bgcolor=#ccffcc
| 31
| February 17
| @ Cleveland
| 
| LeBron James (28)
| Chris Bosh (12)
| LeBron JamesMario Chalmers (5)
| Quicken Loans Arena20,562
| 24–7
|- bgcolor=#ccffcc
| 32
| February 19
| Orlando
| 
| Dwyane Wade (27)
| LeBron James (11)
| LeBron James (8)
| American Airlines Arena20,185
| 25–7
|- bgcolor=#ccffcc
| 33
| February 21
| Sacramento
| 
| Dwyane Wade (30)
| Chris Bosh (10)
| Dwyane Wade (10)
| American Airlines Arena20,068
| 26–7
|- bgcolor=#ccffcc
| 34
| February 23
| New York
| 
| Chris Bosh  (25)
| Udonis HaslemLeBron James (9)
| LeBron James (8)
| American Airlines Arena20,197
| 27–7
|- align="center"
|colspan="9" bgcolor="#bbcaff"|All-Star Break

|- bgcolor=#ccffcc
| 35
| March 1
| @ Portland
| 
| LeBron James (38)
| Udonis Haslem (14)
| Dwyane Wade (10)
| Rose Garden20,597
| 28–7
|- bgcolor=#ffcccc
| 36
| March 2
| @ Utah
| 
| LeBron James (35)
| LeBron James (10)
| LeBron James (6)
| EnergySolutions Arena19,991
| 28–8
|- bgcolor=#ffcccc
| 37
| March 4
| @ L. A. Lakers
| 
| LeBron James (25)
| LeBron James (13)
| LeBron James (7)
| Staples Center18,997
| 28–9
|- bgcolor=#ccffcc
| 38
| March 6
| New Jersey
| 
| LeBron James (21)
| LeBron James (9)
| Mario Chalmers (7)
| American Airlines Arena19,600
| 29–9
|- bgcolor=#ccffcc
| 39
| March 7
| Atlanta
| 
| LeBron James (31)
| LeBron James (11)
| Dwyane Wade (6)
| American Airlines Arena20,018
| 30–9
|- bgcolor=#ccffcc
| 40
| March 10
| Indiana
| 
| Dwyane Wade (28)
| Udonis Haslem (11)
| Dwyane Wade (7)
| American Airlines Arena20,154
| 31–9
|- bgcolor=#ffcccc
| 41
| March 13
| @ Orlando
| 
| Dwyane Wade (28)
| LeBron James (11)
| LeBron James (8)
| Amway Center18,879
| 31–10
|- bgcolor=#ffcccc
| 42
| March 14
| @ Chicago
| 
| Dwyane Wade (36)
| Dwyane Wade (7)
| LeBron James (4)
| United Center23,028
| 31–11
|- bgcolor="#ccffcc"
| 43
| March 16
| @ Philadelphia
| 
| LeBron James (29)
| Dwyane Wade (11)
| LeBron James (8)
| Wells Fargo Center20,396
| 32–11
|- bgcolor="#ccffcc"
| 44
| March 18
| Orlando
| 
| Dwyane Wade (31)
| LeBron James (12)
| LeBron James (7)
| American Airlines Arena20,003
| 33–11
|- bgcolor="#ccffcc"
| 45
| March 20
| Phoenix
| 
| Chris Bosh (29) 
| Udonis Haslem (9)
| Mario Chalmers (8)
| American Airlines Arena20,212
| 34–11
|- bgcolor="#ccffcc"
| 46
| March 23
| @ Detroit
| 
| Dwyane Wade (24)
| Chris BoshDwyane Wade (9)
| LeBron James (10)
| The Palace of Auburn Hills22,076
| 35–11
|- bgcolor=#ffcccc
| 47
| March 25
| @ Oklahoma City
| 
| Dwyane Wade (22)
| Udonis Haslem (9)
| LeBron James (7)
| Chesapeake Energy Arena18,203
| 35–12
|- bgcolor=#ffcccc
| 48
| March 26
| @ Indiana
| 
| LeBron JamesDwyane Wade (24)
| LeBron James (9)
| Dwyane Wade (6)
| Bankers Life Fieldhouse17,415
| 35–13
|- bgcolor="#ccffcc"
| 49
| March 29
| Dallas
| 
| Chris BoshLeBron James (19)
| Chris BoshLeBron James (9)
| LeBron JamesDwyane Wade (5)
| American Airlines Arena20,096
| 36–13
|- bgcolor="#ccffcc"
| 50
| March 30
| @ Toronto
| 
| Chris BoshDwyane Wade (30)
| Chris Bosh (8)
| LeBron James (9)
| Air Canada Centre19,883
| 37–13

|- bgcolor=#ffcccc
| 51
| April 1
| @ Boston
| 
| LeBron James (23)
| Chris Bosh (11)
| Chris Bosh (4)
| TD Garden18,624
| 37–14
|- bgcolor="#ccffcc"
| 52
| April 3
| Philadelphia
| 
| LeBron James (41)
| Udonis Haslem (11)
| Mario ChalmersLeBron James (4)
| American Airlines Arena20,015
| 38–14
|- bgcolor="#ccffcc"
| 53
| April 4
| Oklahoma City
| 
| LeBron James (34)
| Udonis Haslem (8)
| LeBron James (10)
| American Airlines Arena20,104
| 39–14
|- bgcolor=#ffcccc
| 54
| April 6
| Memphis
| 
| LeBron James (21)
| Dwyane Wade (7)
| LeBron James (6)
| American Airlines Arena20,008
| 39–15
|- bgcolor="#ccffcc"
| 55
| April 8
| Detroit
| 
| LeBron James (26)
| Chris BoshRonny Turiaf (9)
| Shane BattierMario Chalmers (5)
| American Airlines Arena20,017
| 40–15
|- bgcolor=#ffcccc
| 56
| April 10
| Boston
| 
| LeBron James (36)
| Chris Bosh (9)
| LeBron James (7)
| American Airlines Arena19,954
| 40–16
|- bgcolor=#ffcccc
| 57
| April 12
| @ Chicago
| 
| LeBron James (30)
| Chris BoshRonny Turiaf (8)
| LeBron James (5)
| United Center23,015
| 40–17
|- bgcolor="#ccffcc"
| 58
| April 13
| Charlotte
| 
| LeBron James (19)
| LeBron James (9)
| LeBron James (5)
| American Airlines Arena19,600
| 41–17
|- bgcolor="#ccffcc"
| 59
| April 15
| @ New York
| 
| LeBron James (29)
| Chris Bosh (14)
| Dwyane Wade (4)
| Madison Square Garden19,763
| 42–17
|- bgcolor="#ccffcc"
| 60
| April 16
| @ New Jersey
| 
| LeBron James (37)
| Chris Bosh (15)
| LeBron James (7)
| Prudential Center18,711
| 43–17
|- bgcolor="#ccffcc"
| 61
| April 18
| Toronto
| 
| LeBron James (28)
| Udonis Haslem (7)
| Mario Chalmers (7)
| American Airlines Arena19,600
| 44–17
|- bgcolor="#ccffcc"
| 62
| April 19
| Chicago
| 
| LeBron James (27)
| LeBron James (11)
| LeBron James (6)
| American Airlines Arena20,008
| 45–17
|- bgcolor=#ffcccc
| 63
| April 21
| Washington
| 
| Mario Chalmers (16)
| Udonis Haslem (15)
| Mario Chalmers (6)
| American Airlines Arena19,722
| 45–18
|- bgcolor="#ccffcc"
| 64
| April 22
| Houston
| 
| LeBron James (32)
| Udonis Haslem (11)
| LeBron James (5)
| American Airlines Arena19,859
| 46–18
|- bgcolor=#ffcccc
| 65
| April 24
| @ Boston
| 
| Dexter Pittman (12)
| Udonis Haslem (13)
| Mario Chalmers (5)
| TD Garden18,624
| 46–19
|- bgcolor=#ffcccc
| 66
| April 26
| @ Washington
| 
| Norris Cole (14)
| Harris, Howard & Turiaf (5)
| Terrel Harris (3)
| Verizon Center19,537
| 46–20

Playoffs

Game log

|- bgcolor="#ccffcc"
| 1
| April 28
| New York
| 
| LeBron James (32)
| Udonis Haslem (8)
| Mario Chalmers (9)
| American Airlines Arena19,621
| 1–0
|- bgcolor="#ccffcc"
| 2
| April 30
| New York
| 
| Dwyane Wade (25)
| Udonis Haslem (8)
| LeBron James (9)
| American Airlines Arena19,684
| 2–0
|- bgcolor="#ccffcc"
| 3
| May 3
| @ New York
| 
| LeBron James (32)
| Chris Bosh (10)
| LeBron James (5)
| Madison Square Garden19,763
| 3–0
|- bgcolor="#ffcccc"
| 4
| May 6
| @ New York
| 
| LeBron James (27)
| Chris Bosh (9)
| Dwyane Wade (6)
| Madison Square Garden19,763
| 3–1
|- bgcolor="#ccffcc"
| 5
| May 9
| New York
| 
| LeBron James (29)
| LeBron James (8)
| LeBron James (7)
| American Airlines Arena19,754
| 4–1

|- bgcolor="#ccffcc"
| 1
| May 13
| Indiana
| 
| LeBron James (32)
| LeBron James (15)
| LeBron James (5)
| American Airlines Arena19,600
| 1–0
|- bgcolor="#ffcccc"
| 2
| May 15
| Indiana
| 
| LeBron James (28)
| LeBron James (9)
| LeBron James (5)
| American Airlines Arena19,828
| 1–1
|- bgcolor="#ffcccc"
| 3
| May 17
| @ Indiana
| 
| Mario Chalmers (25)
| Ronny Turiaf (8)
| Mario Chalmers (5)
| Bankers Life Fieldhouse18,165
| 1–2
|- bgcolor="#ccffcc"
| 4
| May 20
| @ Indiana
| 
| LeBron James (40)
| LeBron James (18)
| LeBron James (9)
| Bankers Life Fieldhouse18,165
| 2–2
|- bgcolor="#ccffcc"
| 5
| May 22
| Indiana
| 
| LeBron James (30)
| Mario Chalmers (11)
| LeBron James (8)
| American Airlines Arena20,097
| 3–2
|- bgcolor="#ccffcc"
| 6
| May 24
| @ Indiana
| 
| Dwyane Wade (41)
| Dwyane Wade (10)
| LeBron James (7)
| Bankers Life Fieldhouse18,165
| 4–2

|- bgcolor="#ccffcc"
| 1
| May 28
| Boston
| 
| LeBron James (32)
| LeBron James (13)
| Dwyane Wade (7)
| American Airlines Arena19,912
| 1–0
|- bgcolor="#ccffcc"
| 2
| May 30
| Boston
| 
| LeBron James (34)
| Udonis Haslem (11)
| LeBron James (7)
| American Airlines Arena19,973
| 2–0
|- bgcolor="#ffcccc"
| 3
| June 1
| @ Boston
| 
| LeBron James (34)
| LeBron James (8)
| Mario Chalmers (6)
| TD Garden18,624
| 2–1
|- bgcolor="#ffcccc"
| 4
| June 3
| @ Boston
| 
| LeBron James (29)
| Udonis Haslem (17)
| Dwyane Wade (6)
| TD Garden18,624
| 2–2
|- bgcolor="#ffcccc"
| 5
| June 5
| Boston
| 
| LeBron James (30)
| Udonis Haslem (14)
| Chalmers & Wade (3)
| American Airlines Arena20,021
| 2–3
|- bgcolor="#ccffcc"
| 6
| June 7
| @ Boston
| 
| LeBron James (45)
| LeBron James (15)
| LeBron James (5)
| TD Garden18,624
| 3–3
|- bgcolor="#ccffcc"
| 7
| June 9
| Boston
| 
| LeBron James (31)
| LeBron James (12)
| Mario Chalmers (7)
| American Airlines Arena20,114
| 4–3

|- bgcolor="#ffcccc"
| 1
| June 12
| @ Oklahoma City
| 
| LeBron James (30)
| Udonis Haslem (11)
| Dwyane Wade (8)
| Chesapeake Energy Arena18,203
| 0–1
|- bgcolor="#ccffcc"
| 2
| June 14
| @ Oklahoma City
| 
| LeBron James (32)
| Chris Bosh (15)
| James & Wade (5)
| Chesapeake Energy Arena18,203
| 1–1
|- bgcolor="#ccffcc"
| 3
| June 17
| Oklahoma City
| 
| LeBron James (29)
| LeBron James (14)
| Dwyane Wade (7)
| American Airlines Arena20,003
| 2–1
|- bgcolor="#ccffcc"
| 4
| June 19
| Oklahoma City
| 
| LeBron James (26)
| Bosh & James (9)
| LeBron James (12)
| American Airlines Arena20,003
| 3–1
|- bgcolor="#ccffcc"
| 5
| June 21
| Oklahoma City
| 
| LeBron James (26)
| LeBron James (11)
| LeBron James (13)
| American Airlines Arena20,003
| 4–1

Player statistics

Season

 Lead team
 Stats as of match played on April 26, 2012 (66 matches played)
 * Stats with the Heat.

Playoffs

 Lead team
 Stats as of match played on June 21, 2012 (23 matches played)

Awards, records and milestones

Awards

Week/Month
 On January 3, 2012 LeBron James was named Eastern Conference's Player of the Week (December 25 – January 1).
 On January 9, 2012 LeBron James was named Eastern Conference's Player of the Week (January 2 – January 8).
 On January 30, 2012 LeBron James was named Eastern Conference's Player of the Week (January 23 – January 29).
 On February 3, 2012 LeBron James was named Eastern Conference's Player of the Month (December – January).
 On February 20, 2012 LeBron James was named Eastern Conference's Player of the Week (February 13 – February 19).
 On March 1, 2012 Erik Spoelstra was named Eastern Conference's Coach of the Month (February).
 On March 2, 2012 LeBron James was named Eastern Conference's Player of the Month (February).
 On April 9, 2012 LeBron James was named Eastern Conference's Player of the Week (April 2 – April 8).
 On April 23, 2012 LeBron James was named Eastern Conference's Player of the Week (April 16 – April 22).

All-Star
 LeBron James was voted to his 8th consecutive NBA All-Star Game as a starter (8th consecutive time as a starter).
 Dwyane Wade was voted to his 8th consecutive NBA All-Star Game (7th consecutive time as a starter).
 Chris Bosh was selected to his 7th consecutive NBA All-Star Game (5th consecutive time as a reserve).
 Mario Chalmers and James Jones were selected to participate in the 2012 NBA All-Star Three-point Shootout.
 Rookie Norris Cole was selected to participate in the 2012 Rising Stars challenge.

Season
 On May 12, 2012 LeBron James won the NBA Most Valuable Player Award for the 3rd time (1st with the Heat).
 On May 23, 2012 LeBron James was named to the NBA All-Defensive First Team for the 4th consecutive time (2nd with the Heat).
 On May 24, 2012 LeBron James was named to the All-NBA First Team.
 On May 24, 2012 Dwyane Wade was named to the All-NBA Third Team.

Playoffs
 On June 21, 2012 LeBron James was named the NBA Finals Most Valuable Player.

Records
 On February 3, 2012 LeBron James became the youngest player to have reached 18,000 career points.
 On April 19, 2012 LeBron James became the youngest player to have reached 19,000 career points.

Milestones
 On February 3, 2012 LeBron James reached 18,000 career points.
 On March 26, 2012 Dwyane Wade reached 600 career blocks.
 On April 19, 2012 LeBron James reached 19,000 career points.

Transactions

Trades

Free agents

Additions

Subtractions

See also
 2011–12 NBA season

References

Miami Heat seasons
Miami Heat
Eastern Conference (NBA) championship seasons
NBA championship seasons
Miami Heat
Miami Heat